The Independent Spirit Award for Best Documentary Feature is one of the annual Independent Spirit Awards. It is given to the director(s) of the film and since 2014 it is also given to the producers. It was first presented in 2000, with Marc Singer's Dark Days being the first recipient of the award.

Winners and nominees

2000s

2010s

2020s

See also
Academy Award for Best Documentary Feature

References

D
American documentary film awards
Awards established in 2000